Exit (stylized in all caps) is a summer music festival which is held at the Petrovaradin Fortress in Novi Sad, Serbia. Founded in 2000, it has twice won the Best Major Festival award at the European Festivals Awards, for 2013 and 2017. EXIT has also won the "Best European Festival" award at the UK Festival Awards in 2007. In March 2018 Regional Cooperation Council awarded EXIT Festival as Champion of Regional Cooperation for 2017.

History
The festival was founded in 2000 in Novi Sad, Serbia as a student movement, fighting for democracy and freedom in Serbia and the Balkans. After the Yugoslavian general election in 2000, Exit moved from the city's university park to the Petrovaradin Fortress in the same city in 2001. Nonetheless, social responsibility is still key aspect of the festival activities. In February 2007, founder and majority owner Dusan Kovacevic, together with his associates, decided to donate the festival to the city of Novi Sad following external offers to purchase the event, with a view that this would keep the festival within the city. Critics felt that in doing so, management of the festival was given away to the region's ruling political party, which they felt was contrary to the movement upon which the festival was initially based.

In 2007 Exit won the Best Overseas Festival award at the UK Festival Awards and was voted Best European Festival at the Yourope Awards. It won the Best Major Festival award at the European Festivals Awards in 2013 and 2017.

In 2006 The Observer listed Exit as its festival pick in its list of top 25 travel experiences. The Guardian listed it in "12 top trips for 2008". The international edition of CNN, CNN World Fiesta, included Exit on the list of nine best music festivals in the world in 2011. In 2013 Euronews listed Exit as sixth in its pick of 10 European music festivals. In 2018 BBC News noted Exit as one of the world's largest music festivals, hosting more than 200,000 people from 60 countries. In June 2019 Forbes published an article claiming that "Thanks to the upcoming EXIT Festival, Serbia is now a new festival hot spot worth your attention".

Superbrands Serbia 2006–2007 listed Exit as one of seven public urban identity superbrands. In March 2018 in Sarajevo, Bosnia and Herzegovina, the Regional Cooperation Council awarded the Exit Festival as Champion of Regional Cooperation for 2017.

Exit organizes seven events in five countries in South-East Europe: No Sleep Festival (Belgrade, Serbia) in April and November, Sea Star Festival (Umag, Croatia) in May; Exit Festival (Novi Sad, Serbia) and Sunland Festival (Primorsko, Bulgaria) In July; Revolution Festival (Timișoara, Romania) and Sea Dance Festival (Budva, Montenegro) in August and Ada Divine Awakening Festival (Ada Bojana, Montenegro) in September. Previously, Exit also organized Festival 84 (Jahorina Mountain, Bosnia and Herzegovina), which was cancelled in February 2019 due to administrative reasons beyond the organizers' control.

Due to the COVID-19 Pandemic, festivals organized by the Exit group in 2020 have been postponed until 2021, except Sea Star, Revolution and No Sleep festivals, which have been postponed until 2022. Exit Festival, which has been pushed back to August 2020 at first, but ultimately postponed until July 2021, with a 4-day semi-virtual edition organized in September 2020, as part of the global Life Stream project. During four days, only 250 daily attenders were allowed live, while videos of the performances were presented at the end of September to the multi-million audience worldwide through the eight day long streaming festival.

In July 2021, the festival became the first major festival to be held in Europe since the beginning of the COVID-19 pandemic, which was reported as a historic moment by leading global media such as Billboard, IQ Mag, Variety and NME. It hosted c. 40,000 attendees per day and took place at the Petrovaradin Fortress, an hour away from capital Belgrade.

Exit festival 2022, under the slogan "Together. Always!", was held in its full capacity compared to the years of the pandemic, across more than 40 stages and zones, and three stages that were improved compared to previous years. Over four days, the festival was visited by about c. 200,000 people, and the main performers were Nick Cave & The Bad Seeds, Calvin Harris, Iggy Azalea, Masked Wolf, ZHU, Sepultura and others.

In November 2022, Exit announced the next edition of the festival, the theme of which is Exit Universe, which will be held from July 6 to 9, 2023, at the Petrovaradin Fortress.

Festival lineups

See also 

 List of rock festivals

References

External links

Rock festivals in Serbia
Pop music festivals
Music festivals in Serbia
Music in Novi Sad
Tourism in Novi Sad
Electronic music festivals in Serbia
Music festivals established in 2000
Summer events in Serbia